Bruce Orlando Leaupepe (born January 30, 1991) is an American professional wrestler. He is currently signed to All Elite Wrestling (AEW), where he performs under the ring name Toa Liona. He also wrestles for AEW's sister promotion, Ring of Honor (ROH), where as a part of The Embassy, he is one-third of the current ROH World Six-Man Tag Team Champions.

Professional wrestling career 
Liona began wrestling on the independent circuit in Los Angeles and Las Vegas in 2020. On 23 October, he made his All Elite Wrestling debut on AEW Dark: Elevation, teaming with Mike Reed in a loss to FTR. On 24 October, he appeared on AEW Dark teaming with Bison XL, losing to 2point0.

On 1 April 2022, Liona was named as one of Tully Blanchard's new clients, teaming with Kaun to form The Gates of Agony. The team defeated Shinobi Shadow Squad (Cheeseburger and Eli Isom) at the event. On 25 May, Liona teamed with Juicy Finau in a GCW Tag Team Championship match, losing to BUSSY.

On 6 July Gates of Agony made their AEW Television debut on Rampage, defeating Jonathan Gresham and Lee Moriarty. On July 23, 2022, at Death Before Dishonor, Prince Nana announced he had purchased Tully Blanchard Enterprises and reformed The Embassy, with Cage, Kaun and Liona. They would go on to defeat the team of Alex Zayne, Blake Christian and Tony Deppen during the preshow. At Final Battle, The Embassy defeated Dalton Castle and The Boys, to win the ROH World Six-Man Tag Team Championships.
Gates of Agony suffered a loss to FTR at Battle of the Belts IV.

Personal life 
Liona is of Samoan and Puerto Rican descent.

Championships and accomplishments 
Future Stars of Wrestling
 FSW Tag Team Championship (1 time) – with Juicy Finau

KnokX Pro Entertainment
 Urban Empire Championship (1 time)

Ring of Honor
 ROH World Six-Man Tag Team Championship (1 time, current) – with Brian Cage and Kaun

References

External links 
 
 
 
 

Samoan professional wrestlers
American male professional wrestlers
American sportspeople of Samoan descent
Living people
People from San Jose, California
Professional wrestlers from California
1991 births
ROH World Six-Man Tag Team Champions
All Elite Wrestling personnel